Ricardo Adolfo Jacobo Carty (born September 1, 1939), nicknamed "Beeg Boy", is a Dominican former professional baseball player. Carty had a career batting average of .299 and, was the 1970 National League (NL) batting champion with a .366 batting average. He earned his starting role in the 1970 All-Star Game as a write-in candidate.

Carty also played for the Chicago Cubs, Oakland Athletics, Cleveland Indians, Toronto Blue Jays and Texas Rangers. He was one of the earliest Dominicans to play in the major leagues however, his career was marked by battles with injuries, illnesses (tuberculosis) and teammates. In 1996, Carty was inducted into the Caribbean Baseball Hall of Fame as part of their inaugural class.

Major League career
Carty represented the Dominican Republic at the 1959 Pan American Games. He signed a contract with the Milwaukee Braves as a free agent in 1959. While he was an excellent hitter, he had poor defensive skills. Originally a catcher, Carty was converted into an outfielder in order to lessen his defensive liabilities and to get his bat into the everyday lineup.

After four years in the minor leagues, Carty made an impressive major league debut in 1964, finishing second to Roberto Clemente in the National League Batting Championship with a .330 batting average, finishing the season as runner-up to Dick Allen in the 1964 National League Rookie of the Year Award ballot.

He continued to hit over .300 for the next three seasons but, then faltered in 1967, slumping to a .255 batting average in part due to a separated shoulder. Carty then missed the entire 1968 season while battling with tuberculosis. He recovered in 1969 with a .342 batting average, helping the Braves win the National League Western Division title, the franchise's first post-season berth since the 1958 World Series, and finishing 13th in the National League Most Valuable Player Award voting. The Braves would eventually lose to the "Miracle" Mets in the 1969 National League Championship Series.

Carty had his best season in 1970 when he hit 25 home runs with 101 runs batted in and, won the National League Batting Championship with a .366 batting average, the highest average in the major leagues since Ted Williams recorded a .388 batting average in 1957. Despite not appearing on the All-Star ballot, he was voted to be a starting outfielder for the National League as a write-in candidate in the 1970 All-Star Game, playing alongside Hank Aaron and Willie Mays in the outfield. It would be the only All-Star appearance of his career.  Carty also compiled a 31-game hitting streak in 1970 (the longest by a Braves hitter in the franchise's Atlanta history until Dan Uggla surpassed it with a 33-game streak in 2011).  He was named NL Player of the Month in May with a .448 batting average, 7 home runs, and 22 RBI, and finished 10th in the 1970 National League Most Valuable Player Award voting.

A crushed knee injury suffered during the Dominican Winter Baseball season meant Carty would miss another entire season in 1971.

He returned in 1972, but only managed a .277 batting average. By then, Carty had worn out his welcome with the Braves management as well as his teammates, having been involved in fights with Hank Aaron and Ron Reed. He was traded from the Braves to the Texas Rangers for Jim Panther on October 27, 1972. Carty was expected to fill the role of the newly adopted designated hitter, but batted only .232 before being traded in mid-season to the Chicago Cubs. While with the Cubs, he had a personality clash with their star third baseman, Ron Santo, forcing the team to trade Carty to the Oakland Athletics one month later. With a combined .229 batting average for the three teams, Carty was released by the Athletics in December 1973 and, it seemed as if his career might be over.

In 1974 he signed to play with the Cafeteros de Córdoba in the Mexican Baseball League. In August 1974, the Cleveland Indians signed him to be their designated hitter. Carty's career was rejuvenated with Cleveland, posting a .308 batting average with 64 runs batted in during the 1975 season and, improving to a .310 batting average with 83 runs batted in for the 1976 season. In 1977, his batting average dropped to .280 however, he still produced 80 runs batted in.

He was dealt from the Indians to the Toronto Blue Jays for Dennis DeBarr on March 15, 1978. His time with the Blue Jays lasted five months before he was sent to the Oakland Athletics for Willie Horton and Phil Huffman on August 15, 1978. At the age of 39, he hit for a combined .282 batting average with 31 home runs and 99 runs batted in. After being granted free agency in November 1978, he signed a contract to play for the Blue Jays, hitting .256 with 12 home runs and 55 RBI in 132 games before retiring at the end of 1979 at the age of 40.

Career statistics
In a fifteen-year major league career, Carty played in 1,651 games, accumulating 1,677 hits in 5,606 at bats for a .299 career batting average along with 204 home runs, 890 runs batted in, .369 on-base percentage and .464 slugging percentage. He ended his career with a .974 fielding percentage. During his career, he played as a catcher, first baseman, third baseman, outfielder and designated hitter.

Humanitarianism
One of the early major leaguers out of the baseball-rich Dominican Republic, Carty was committed to helping the developing nation.  In the 1964–65 off-season, as the country reeled between rapid governmental transitions and militarism, he undertook a trip with Catholic Relief Services to his home country, on a mission to deliver clothing and supplies.

Honors
In 1996 he gained induction into the Caribbean Baseball Hall of Fame as part of their first class.

See also
 List of Major League Baseball batting champions

References

External links
, or Retrosheet

1939 births
Living people
Águilas Cibaeñas players
Atlanta Braves players
Austin Senators players
Baseball players at the 1959 Pan American Games
Cafeteros de Córdoba players
Chicago Cubs players
Cleveland Indians players
Davenport Braves players
Dominican Republic expatriate baseball players in Canada
Dominican Republic expatriate baseball players in Mexico
Dominican Republic expatriate baseball players in the United States
Dominican Republic people of Cocolo descent
Eau Claire Braves players
Estrellas Orientales players
Leones del Escogido players
Major League Baseball designated hitters
Major League Baseball left fielders
Major League Baseball players from the Dominican Republic
Milwaukee Braves players
National League All-Stars
National League batting champions
Oakland Athletics players
Pan American Games competitors for the Dominican Republic
Sportspeople from San Pedro de Macorís
Texas Rangers players
Tigres de Aragua players
Tigres del Licey players
Toronto Blue Jays players
Toronto Maple Leafs (International League) players
Yakima Braves players
Dominican Republic expatriate baseball players in Venezuela